Twilight is the third album released by Blue System. It was released on 9 October 1989 by BMG Ariola and was produced by Dieter Bohlen.

Track listing
All songs written and arranged by Dieter Bohlen.
   "Magic Symphony" – 3:34
   "Love Me on the Rocks" – 3:27
   "Save Me" – 3:45
   "Nobody Makes Me Crazy (Like You Do)" – 3:27
   "Madonna Blue" – 3:40
   "Call Me Dr. Love (A New Dimension)" – 3:20
   "Little Jeannie" – 3:28
   "Carry Me Oh Carrie" – 3:15
   "Big Yellow Taxi" – 3:20
   "Everything I Own" – 3:10

Personnel
 Dieter Bohlen –  lead vocals, producer, arranger, lyrics
 Rolf Köhler – refrain vocals, chorus falsetto
 Detlef Wiedeke – chorus falsetto
 Michael Scholz – chorus falsetto
 Luis Rodríguez – co-producer, engineering

Charts

Weekly charts

Year-end charts

Certifications

External links

References

Blue System albums
1989 albums
Bertelsmann Music Group albums